Olszanka  is a village in Brzeg County, Opole Voivodeship, in south-western Poland. It is the seat of the gmina (administrative district) called Gmina Olszanka.

Before 1945 the village of Alzenau (in German) was part of Germany (see Territorial changes of Poland after World War II).

References

Olszanka